Gerhard Allroggen (born 19 May 1936) is a German musicologist and emeritus University professor from Detmold and Paderborn.

Life 
Born in Bochum, Allroggen gained his habilitation in 1976 at the Ruhr-Universität Bochum. From 1991 to 1995 he was also vice-rector of the Paderborn University. He retired in 2001.

Allroggen's research interests include the music and musical aesthetics of early German Romanticism, Wolfgang Amadeus Mozart, and the Neapolitan Opera of the late 18th century.

Allroggen was a member of the Neue Mozart-Ausgabe, co-editor of the complete edition of the literary works of E. T. A. Hoffmann and is currently leader of the Carl-Maria-von-Weber-Gesamtausgabe.

Publications 
 E. T. A. Hoffmanns Kompositionen. Ein chronologisch-thematisches Verzeichnis seiner musikalischen Werke mit Einführung (Studien zur Musikgeschichte des 19. Jahrhunderts, vol. 16) Regensburg: Bosse, 1970
 E. T. A. Hoffmann, Die lustigen Musikanten. Singspiel in zwei Akten. (Ausgewählte musikalische Werke von E. T. A. Hoffmann), Mainz: Schott, 1975/76
 Weber-Studien. (co-editor), continuous series.
 Festschrift Arno Forchert zum 60. Geburtstag.

Festschrift 
 Joachim Veit and Frank Ziegler (ed.): Weber-Studien, vol. 3 (Festschrift Gerhard Allroggen zum 60. Geburtstag), Mainz 1996

References

External links 
 Gerhard Allroggen in WorldCat
 Gerhard Allroggen als Herausgeber der Weber-Gesamtausgabe
 

20th-century German musicologists
1936 births
Living people
People from Bochum